The 2004–05 season was the 127th season in Bolton Wanderers F.C.'s existence, and was their fourth consecutive year in the top-flight. This article covers the period from 1 July 2004 to 30 June 2005.

Season summary
Bolton finished in sixth place in the final Premiership table - tied on points but one place behind that season's European champions Liverpool, and three points off qualification for the Champions League. As it was, sixth place was enough to grant Bolton their first ever excursion into European competition, in the UEFA Cup.

Final league table

First-team squad

Left club during season

Reserve squad

Transfers

In
  Michael Bridges -  Leeds United, free, 9 June
  Les Ferdinand -  Leicester City, free, 5 July
  Radhi Jaïdi -  Espérance, free, 6 July
  Gary Speed -  Newcastle United, £750,000, 21 July
  Fernando Hierro -  Al Rayyan, free, 28 July
  Tal Ben Haim -  Maccabi Tel Aviv, £203,000, 28 July
  El Hadji Diouf -  Liverpool, season loan, 19 August
  Blessing Kaku -  F.C. Ashdod, free transfer, 24 August
  Khalilou Fadiga -  Internazionale, free, 14 September
  Vincent Candela -  Roma, free transfer, 31 January
  Júlio César -  Real Valladolid, free, July

Out
  Simon Charlton -  Norwich City, £250,000, 13 July
  Jeff Smith -  Port Vale, free, 22 June
  Per Frandsen -  Wigan Athletic, free, 24 June
  Emerson Thome -  Wigan Athletic, free, 4 August
  Mário Jardel -  Newell's Old Boys, free, 13 August
  Ibrahim Ba -  Çaykur Rizespor, free, 24 August
  Michael Bridges -  Sunderland, season loan, 23 September
  Youri Djorkaeff -  Blackburn Rovers, free, 28 September
  Les Ferdinand -  Reading, free, 6 January
  Danny Livesey -  Carlisle United, month loan, 25 December
  Danny Livesey -  Carlisle United, free, 25 January
  Joey O'Brien -  Sheffield Wednesday, loan
  Derek Niven -  Chesterfield
  Steve Howey -  New England Revolution, free
  Ndiwa Lord-Kangana - released
  Jeremy Bon - released
  Lewis Hamlin - released

Note: All players listed as joining other clubs from Bolton on a free transfer were released by the club on 17 May 2004, with the exception of Ferdinand, who was released on 2 January 2005.

Matches

August

September

October

November

December

January

February

March

April

May

Statistics

Appearances
Bolton used a total of 26 players during the season.

Top scorers

Notes

References

 

2004-05
2004–05 FA Premier League by team